Aleksey Pogorelov (born 26 March 1983 in Bishkek) is a Kyrgyzstani-born Russian hurdler.

He finished sixth at the 2006 Asian Games. He also competed at the 2005 World Championships and the 2008 Olympic Games without reaching the final.

His personal best time is 49.42 seconds, achieved in June 2008 in Bishkek.

Competition record

External links
 

1983 births
Living people
Kyrgyzstani male hurdlers
Athletes (track and field) at the 2008 Summer Olympics
Olympic athletes of Kyrgyzstan
Sportspeople from Bishkek
Kyrgyzstani people of Russian descent
Kyrgyzstani emigrants to Russia
Athletes (track and field) at the 2006 Asian Games
Russian male hurdlers
Asian Games competitors for Kyrgyzstan